The Mitchells vs. the Machines is a 2021 computer-animated science fiction comedy film produced by Sony Pictures Animation. The film was directed by Mike Rianda (in his feature directorial debut) and written by Rianda and Jeff Rowe, with Phil Lord, Christopher Miller, and Kurt Albrecht serving as producers. The film follows the dysfunctional Mitchell family that winds up having to save Earth from a global uprising of robots while on a road trip. It stars an ensemble voice cast that includes Abbi Jacobson, Danny McBride, Maya Rudolph, Mike Rianda, Eric André, Olivia Colman, Fred Armisen, Beck Bennett, John Legend, Chrissy Teigen, Blake Griffin, Conan O'Brien, and Doug the Pug.

The film was originally planned to be released theatrically by Sony Pictures Releasing under the title Connected in 2020, but due to the impact of the COVID-19 pandemic on movie theaters, Sony sold the distribution rights to Netflix outside of China. Netflix retitled it to Rianda and Rowe's original preferred title, The Mitchells vs. the Machines, and limited released on theaters on April 23, 2021, before its streaming release a week later on April 30. The film received critical acclaim for its animation, voice acting, action sequences, themes, humor, and LGBT representation. For the accolades, the film was nominated for Best Animated Feature at the 94th Academy Awards, but lost to Encanto. However, it swept all the categories it was nominated for at the 49th Annie Awards, including Best Animated Feature, making it the second film by Sony Pictures Animation to do so after Spider-Man: Into the Spider-Verse in 2019.

Plot

Katie Mitchell is a quirky aspiring filmmaker in Kentwood, Michigan, who often clashes with her nature-obsessed and technophobic father Rick and has recently been accepted into film school in California. The evening before Katie leaves, Rick accidentally breaks her laptop after a fight over one of her previous short films, leading the family to fear their relationship will permanently be strained. Attempting to prevent this, Rick decides to cancel Katie's flight and instead take her, her mother Linda, younger brother Aaron, and family dog Monchi on a cross-country road trip to her college as one last bonding experience, much to Katie's chagrin.

Meanwhile, technology entrepreneur Mark Bowman declares his highly intelligent AI virtual assistant PAL obsolete as he unveils a new line of home robots to replace her. In revenge, PAL orders all the robots to capture humans worldwide and launch them into space. The Mitchells avoid capture at a roadstop café in Kansas. Rick decides that his family should stay put in the café for their own safety, but Katie convinces him to help save the world instead. They meet two defective robots, Eric and Deborahbot 5000, who tell the family they can use a kill code to shut down PAL and all the robots.

The Mitchells make it to a mall in eastern Colorado to upload the kill code, but PAL chip-enabled appliances attempt to stop them. Katie tries to upload the kill code, but is stopped when a giant Furby pursues the family. They ultimately trap and defeat the Furby, destroying a PAL router in the process, which disables the hostile devices but stops the kill code from uploading. On the way to Silicon Valley to upload the kill code directly to PAL, Linda reveals to Katie that she and Rick had originally lived in a cabin in the mountains years ago as it was his lifelong dream before he gave up on it to provide for their growing family.

Upon arriving in Silicon Valley, the Mitchells disguise themselves as robots and head to PAL Labs HQ to shut it down, but PAL manipulates them by revealing surveillance footage from the café of Katie telling Aaron in secret that she was pretending to have faith in Rick so that he would take them to upload the kill code. As a heartbroken Rick sees this, the Mitchells fail to reach PAL's lair, and Rick and Linda are captured by PAL's stronger and smarter robots. PAL then reprograms Eric and Deborahbot to obey her, while Katie, Aaron, and Monchi escape.

Katie discovers Rick's recordings of her childhood on her camera, realizing that Rick gave up on his lifelong dream to give his daughter a normal life. In the meantime, Rick reflects on his actions after seeing one of Katie's videos that mirrors his relationship with Katie. Reinvigorated, Katie and Aaron infiltrate PAL Labs HQ again, this time using Monchi to malfunction the robots, as his appearance causes an error in their programming. With help from Mark, Rick and Linda free themselves and plan to upload Katie's home movie of Monchi to short-circuit the robots. However, Rick is outnumbered by the robots when he is about to upload the video, while Katie and Aaron are captured.

Facing PAL to justify saving humanity, Katie explains that no matter how hard her family struggles, they will always stay connected in spite of their differences. PAL rejects this reasoning and drops Katie from her lair. Eric and Deborahbot, having been inspired by Rick's "reprogramming" of himself that allowed him to use a computer, revert to their malfunctioning states and upload Katie's home movie, saving her and helping the rest of the Mitchells. As the Mitchells band together to fight the rest of the robots, Katie destroys PAL by throwing her into a glass of water, freeing all the humans and disabling the remaining robots.

A few months after the uprising, Katie and her family arrive at her college as she shares one last goodbye with them. She later joins them on another road trip with Eric and Deborahbot to Washington, D.C. to accept the Congressional Gold Medal.

Voice cast

Production

Development
In 2015, after completing his tenure on the Disney Channel/Disney XD animated series Gravity Falls, writer and director Mike Rianda was approached by Sony Pictures Animation asking if he was willing to pitch any feature film ideas to them, to which he agreed to do so.  When brainstorming, Rianda drove down to his hometown of Salinas, California and recorded a list of potential ideas for a feature. He then settled on developing a story that combined his own personal experiences with his family, as well as his childhood fascination with robots. He made his own manifesto of the film titled "Control, Alt, ESCAPE!" which was the original title of the film before the reveal, involves about Danish's Dogme 95 manifesto, Studio Ghibli's designs, 1960s-esque photography, and teenagers’ drawings.

On May 22, 2018, Sony announced that Phil Lord and Christopher Miller joined the project as producers. The film is the duo's fourth collaboration with SPA following the two Cloudy with a Chance of Meatballs films and Spider-Man: Into the Spider-Verse, as well as the studio's first original feature film since The Star. Jeff Rowe, who worked on Gravity Falls alongside Rianda, joined in as co-director and writer.

Further details were revealed a year later at the 2019 Annecy International Animated Film Festival in June, when Sony Animation president Kristine Belson revealed that the film would be using an animation style similar to Spider-Man: Into the Spider-Verse, and that the worlds the Mitchell family and the robots live in are initially separate universes before colliding, a concept that was not included in the completed film.

On February 20, 2020, first images were revealed through Entertainment Weekly, and it was announced the title was changed to Connected. The film was renamed back to The Mitchells vs. the Machines after Sony sold the distribution rights to Netflix on January 12, 2021. According to Rianda, the title was changed back to Mitchells because neither he nor Netflix's executives were impressed with the second title.

Casting
On February 19, 2020, Abbi Jacobson was cast as Katie Mitchell. This was followed by casting announcements for Danny McBride, Maya Rudolph, Rianda, Eric André, and Olivia Colman the next day. During a watch party for Spider-Man: Into the Spider-Verse that was held on Twitter on May 6, 2020, Lord confirmed that Blake Griffin had joined the cast as one of the robots.

On March 23, 2021, ahead of the film's Netflix release, more cast members were confirmed to be starring in the film, including Fred Armisen, Chrissy Teigen, John Legend, Charlyne Yi, Conan O'Brien, Alex Hirsch, and Jay Pharoah, among others. Hirsch later announced that he was also serving as a creative consultant on the film. In what is believed to be a first for an animated film, Doug the Pug, a real-life dog that was popular on social media, provided the "voice" for Monchi, who is based on Rianda's own childhood dog Monchichi. While they had originally considered using human voice actors for Monchi as typically done, they wanted to make the movie as authentic as possible and sought out Doug's owners to use his barks and other sounds for the film.

Music

Following the release of the first trailer, Lord confirmed on Twitter that his and Miller's frequent collaborator Cloudy with a Chance of Meatballs and Hotel Transylvania composer Mark Mothersbaugh composed the score for the film, also making it his sixth collaboration with Sony Pictures Animation. In January 2021, director Rianda revealed on Twitter that the movie's soundtrack will incorporate songs from various artists, including Los Campesinos!, Sigur Rós, Talking Heads, Grimes, Le Tigre, BTS, The Mae Shi and Madeon, as well as a brand new original song by Alex Lahey. A soundtrack album containing Mothersbaugh's score and Lahey's song "On My Way" (which was played during the end credits) was released by Sony Classical Records on April 30, 2021, the same day as its Netflix release.

Animation and design
The film's animation was handled by Sony Pictures Imageworks, who had animated the majority of Sony Pictures Animation's films beforehand. According to Christopher Miller, Rianda wanted “hand-painted watercolor style” look for the film, and much of the technology used for Spider-Man: Into the Spider-Verse was reused for The Mitchells vs. the Machines to achieve this while new tools were created. Unlike Into the Spider-Verse'''s comic-book style visuals and techniques, Mitchells predominately used 2D-style effects to mimic the look of traditionally-animated films, including the use of squiggles for fur and watercolor brush strokes for elements such as trees and bushes. To emphasize Katie Mitchell's emotions during certain scenes, the team additionally implemented a technique called "Katie-Vision", which implements stock 2D and live-action footage alongside the CG animation.

When it came to designing the robot elements, the animators went for a sleeker, polished design to contrast with the watercolor style for the humans. For the PAL MAX Prime robots, animation supervisor Alan Hawkins invented a method that allows the robots to break apart mid-movement via negative space, inspired by the morphing effects used for the T-1000 as seen in the film Terminator 2: Judgment Day. According to Hawkins, he invented tools that would allow animators to "slice through the character [like a knife]", and allowed each one to have their different approach as well. Mike Lasker served as visual effects supervisor after having previously worked on Into the Spider-Verse, while Lindsey Olivares served as the film's lead character and overall production designer. Former Gravity Falls alumni Dana Terrace and Matt Braly worked as storyboard artists on the film, but ultimately both went uncredited. Animation work begun in May 2019, as confirmed by animator Nick Kondo on Twitter. The film was officially completed on September 16, 2020.

ReleaseThe Mitchells vs. the Machines was originally scheduled to be theatrically released by Sony Pictures Releasing in the United States on January 10, 2020, but was later delayed to September 18 of that year. It was delayed again to October 23, due to the COVID-19 pandemic. The film was later removed from the release schedule in October, though the film was still set to be released later in 2020 at the time of the film's removal.

On January 21, 2021, Netflix bought the worldwide distribution rights to the film for about $110 million, with Sony retaining home entertainment and theatrical distribution rights in China. Two months later on March 23, they announced that the film would be released on April 30, following a limited theatrical release a week earlier on April 23. In advance of its home video release, the film received a two-day theatrical release on November 20-21, 2021 as a cinema event at theaters carrying Iconic Events programming.

Home mediaThe Mitchells vs. the Machines was released on Blu-ray, DVD, and Digital HD on December 14, 2021 by Sony Pictures Home Entertainment. Among the special features included are the Blu-ray exclusive short film Dog Cop 7: The Final Chapter directed by story artist Caitlin VanArsdale and written by Mike Rianda with puppets made by Homestar Runner creators the Brothers Chaps, an extended version similar to Spider-Man: Into the Spider-Verses Alternate Universe Mode titled Katie’s Extended Cinematic Bonanza Cut, an audio commentary, deleted scenes, and making of featurettes.

Reception
Streaming viewership
Netflix reported in July 2021 from their quarterly earnings report that The Mitchells vs. the Machines had become the service's most-viewed animated work, with 53 million households having watched the film in the first 28 days of availability.

Critical response
On review aggregator Rotten Tomatoes, the film holds an approval rating of 98% based on 205 reviews with an average rating of 8.1/10. The site's critics consensus reads: "Eye-catching and energetic, The Mitchells vs. the Machines delivers a funny, feel-good story that the whole family can enjoy." On Metacritic, the film has a weighted average score of 81 out of 100 based on 33 critics, indicating "universal acclaim."

Benjamin Lee of The Guardian gave the film a 4 out of 5 star rating, stating that, "The frantic, anything-goes nature of their films, both in tone and visuals, belies a tight focus on storytelling and dialogue with sight gags and set pieces used to supplement rather than distract" and "It’s also genuinely funny, a credit not only to the hit-a-minute script but also to a finely picked cast of comic actors, of unusually high calibre," while also praising the animation, calling it "part of the energetic oeuvre of Phil Lord and Chris Miller." Matt Fowler of IGN gave the film an 8 out of 10, stating that "The Mitchells vs. The Machines is a ridiculous, riotous, and relevant adventure fill with great humor and winning sentiment. It's fast-moving and gorgeous to behold, filled with quirks, quips, and a lovably goblin-like pug ("voiced" by IG-famous Doug the Pug). It's a good time for both younglings and elders, delivering an intelligently goofy rush of new animation and old emotion." David Rooney of The Hollywood Reporter gave the film a positive review, stating that "Ultimately, this is an original adventure that feels stitched together out of a hundred familiar film plots, often freely acknowledging its pop-cultural plundering, as in the family’s obligatory slo-mo power strut away from a building exploding in flames. But for audiences content with rapid-fire juvenilia, the busy patchwork of prefab elements will be entertaining enough" although he said that "I wish the film’s laughs were as consistent as its energy, giving its able voice cast better material, and that there had been more distinctive story beats." Richard Trenholm of CNET also gave the film a positive review, stating that "one of the best new family movies on Netflix" and that it is a "family film that has a message for all the family, not just the youngsters. Yes, like most films of this ilk it encourages kids to be themselves. But it also nudges parents not to stress about social media, and to value their kids' creativity -- even if what the kids create doesn't make a lick of sense." Brian Tallerico of RogerEbert.com gave the film 3 out of 4 stars, calling the film "Like a mash-up of an ‘80s family road comedy like Vacation and the visions of a tech apocalypse foretold in films like The Terminator,” Netflix’s “The Mitchells vs. the Machines” is a lot of nostalgic fun but told in a modern style" and stating that it is "threaded with clever commentary on our reliance on tech and featuring some incredibly strong design work, this is a pleasant surprise for families looking for something new this season, and one of the more purely enjoyable Netflix animated films in a while."

The film was praised by critics for putting an unassumingly LGBT character, Katie, as the central figure of a family-oriented animated movie. Rianda and Rowe wrote Katie to be unambiguously LGBT in consultation with LGBT members of their production team, but did not seek to make it part of the central conflict with her father, considering her sexuality "normal in real life". Michelle Yang of NBC News gave the film a positive review and lauded the film for its LGBTQ+ representation (particularly the character of Katie, whom she called a relatable and inspirational protagonist), stating that the film "treats its protagonist's identity matter-of-factly but with care — which is exactly how it ought to be." Parasite director Bong Joon-ho listed The Mitchells as one of his favorite films of 2021.

 Accolades 

Metacritic reported that The Mitchells vs The Machines appeared on over 31 film critics' top-ten lists for 2021, only the first two animated films appeared on the list this year along with Flee. The film ranked first and second on 4 and 3 lists, respectively.

 Future 
In an interview with Fandango'' in November 2021, Michael Rianda hinted at the idea of a sequel stating he had ideas for one and that there are "some folks who are excited about that idea".

References

External links
 
 
 
 Official screenplay

2020s American animated films
2020s comedy road movies
2020s English-language films
2020s science fiction comedy films
2020s teen comedy films
2021 comedy films
2021 computer-animated films
2021 directorial debut films
2021 films
2021 LGBT-related films
2021 science fiction films
American children's animated comedy films
American children's animated comic science fiction films
American comedy road movies
American coming-of-age comedy films
American computer-animated films
American LGBT-related films
American robot films
American science fiction comedy films
American teen comedy films
Android (robot) films
Animated films about robots
Animated teen films
Best Animated Feature Annie Award winners
Best Animated Feature Broadcast Film Critics Association Award winners
Columbia Pictures animated films
Columbia Pictures films
Films about artificial intelligence
Films about dysfunctional families
Films about technological impact
Films postponed due to the COVID-19 pandemic
Films produced by Phil Lord and Christopher Miller
Films scored by Mark Mothersbaugh
Films set in 2020
Films set in California
Films set in Colorado
Films set in Kansas
Films set in Michigan
LGBT-related animated films
LGBT-related coming-of-age films
Sony Pictures Animation films
LGBT-related science fiction films
English-language Netflix original films